Ngọc Linh (a Sino-Vietnamese name meaning "Jade Mountain") is a  mountain of the Annamite Range in Vietnam. It straddles the two provinces of Quảng Nam and Kon Tum. It is considered "the roof of Southern Vietnam".

Panax vietnamensis, a species of ginseng native to the South Central Coast and Central Highlands regions of Vietnam first identified as a separate species in 1973, is especially common on and around mount Ngọc Linh. The area of Ngọc Linh mountain is also the only known habitat of Gracixalus lumarius or thorny tree frog and of the similar Gracixalus trieng or Trieng tree frog.

Notes

References

External links
Notes on mammals of the Ngoc Linh Nature Reserve (Vietnam, Kon Tum Province)

Mountains of Vietnam
Landforms of Kon Tum province
Landforms of Quảng Nam province